Antoing Castle is one of Belgium's most original and well-known castles, situated in Antoing in Hainaut, Wallonia.

It was first mentioned in the 12th century. Although the present structure of the castle dates from the 13th and 15th centuries, it was redesigned in Neo-Gothic style in the 19th century by the French architect Viollet-le-Duc.

The castle at Antoing first belonged to the powerful Melun family, then passed in 1634 to the Princes de Ligne by inheritance, who still own it.

Filming Location
Antoing Castle was used as the primary filming location for The Devil's Nightmare a Belgian/Italian co-production

See also
List of castles in Belgium

Notes

External links

Castle of Antoing www.eupedia.com
Castle of Antoing, Castles of Hainault

Buildings and structures completed in the 13th century
Buildings and structures completed in the 15th century
Buildings and structures completed in the 19th century
Castles in Belgium
Castles in Hainaut (province)